The Tour of Romania (or "Little Loop") is a cycling competition held in Romania. It is organised as 2.1 race on the UCI Europe Tour.

History
Inspired by Tour de France, the monthly publication "Car Magazine" held in August 1910 the first edition of "Circuit Wallachia". The competition took 12 riders at the start on the route Bucharest–Sinaia–Târgoviște–Butimanu–Bucharest (approximately ). The race lasted for three editions. Since 1934 the newspaper "Daily Sport", in collaboration with Romanian Cycling Federation has organized the Tour of Romania. Romania became the sixth country in the world to organize a National Amateur Cycling Tour, after Belgium (1906), Netherlands (1909), Bulgaria (1924), Hungary (1925) and Poland (1928).

Statistics
 At the 19th edition of 1973, Cluj, a stage was held nocturnal on the  distance.
 Rider Traian Chicomban of Brașov participated in the January edition (1934) until the 9th edition (1954), as the Tour's longest-running participation of Romania.
 45th edition (2008) was the first edition which was featured in the calendar Union Cycliste Internationale.

Winners

Classifications
The jerseys worn by the leaders of the individual classifications are:
  Yellow Jersey – Worn by the leader of the general classification.
  Red Jersey – Worn by the leader of the points classification.
  Green Jersey – Worn by the leader of the climber classification. 
  White Jersey – Worn by the best rider under 23 years of age on the overall classification.
  Blue Jersey – Worn by the best Romanian rider of the overall classification.

External links

 Official website

 
UCI Europe Tour races
Recurring sporting events established in 1934
Cycle races in Romania
1934 establishments in Romania
Greater Romania
Summer events in Romania